Maison Blanche is a station of the Paris Métro, serving Line 7. South of this station, the line forks into two branches, one leading to Villejuif – Louis Aragon and the other to Mairie d'Ivry. Also, an extension of Paris Metro Line 14 to Orly Airport in 2024 will pass through this station as part of the Grand Paris Express.

Location
The station is located under Avenue d'Italie, between Rue Caillaux and Rue Bourgon, near Porte d'Italie, a gate in the former Thiers Wall. Towards the south, this is the last station in the common trunk line before the branches separate, thanks to an underground grade-separated junction located after the station, one towards Mairie d'Ivry and the other towards Villejuif-Louis Aragon. Oriented approximately along a north-south axis, it is positioned between Tolbiac on the one hand and Porte d'Italie (towards Ivry) or Le Kremlin-Bicêtre (towards Villejuif) on the other.

History
It opened as part of a planned section of Line 7, which was temporarily operated as part of Line 10 until the completion of the under-Seine crossing of line 7 from Pont de Sully to Place Monge. On 7 March 1930 the line was extended from Place d'Italie to Porte de Choisy, including Maison Blanche.  The station was integrated into line 7 on 26 April 1931. The station is named after the district, which gets its name from a hotel of the same name, which is French for "White House".

Along with Place des Fêtes,  a prototype air raid shelter was added to the station in 1935 to protect it from chemical attacks and was fitted with airtight doors to allow the people to take refuge inside in the event of an attack. They were chosen due to their proximity to the heavily populated, working-class districts. 

Early plans to extend line 14 from Olympiades to the Orly Airport included the possibility of taking over the existing line 7 branch from this station to Villejuif – Louis Aragon, which opened in the early-1980s. However, the inclusion of line 14 in the Grand Paris Express project means that the line 14 extension to Orly will only consist of new infrastructure.

An attack was perpetrated by a terrorist group (GIA) near the station on 6 October 1995. A gas cylinder placed in a trash can was discovered by a postman, but it exploded while the police set up a security perimeter; the toll is 18 injured. The place was chosen to reference the circumstances of the arrest of Khaled Kelkal, one of the main instigators of the RER B attack in Saint-Michel. A few days earlier, on 29 September 1995, the police had shot Kelkal during his arrest at a place called Maison Blanche, near Vaugneray (Rhône).

As part of RATP's Renouveau du métro renewal program, the station corridors and platform lighting were renovated on 4 October 2006.

In 2019, 1,803,381 travellers entered this station, which places it at the 259th position among metro stations for its number of visitors out of 302.

Passenger services

Access
The station has three entrances in front of no's 103, 144 and 162 in the Avenue d'Italie.

A fourth entrance , located at no. 119, was closed in November 2019 to allow the construction of the line 14 station. In return, the entrance located at no. 162 was rebuilt from 2016 to 2019 and provided with a escalator to exit the station.

Station layout

Platforms
Maison Blanche is a standard configuration station. It has two platforms separated by the metro tracks and the vault is elliptical. The decoration is of the style used for the majority of metro stations. The lighting canopies are white and rounded in the Gaudin style of the renouveau du métro des années 2000 renewal, and the bevelled white ceramic tiles cover the upright wall, the vault and the tunnel exits. The advertising frames are in honey-coloured faience and the name of the station is also in earthenware. The seats are Motte style in a blue colour.

Bus connections
The station is served by line 47 and by the urban service La Traverse Bièvre Montsouris of the RATP Bus Network.

Line 14 extension project
 As part of the extension to the south of Line 14 towards Orly Airport, under the contracting authority of the Société du Grand Paris, the station should become around 2024, a connection station between the two lines, under the name Maison Blanche - Paris XIIIe. It would host a Véligo station. It will be one of the three stations of Line 14 built in Paris as part of the Grand Paris Express, while the other two, Pont Cardinet and Porte de Clichy, are under the contracting authority of Île-de-France Mobilités, located in the 17th arrondissement, in the north of the capital.

The station will be located between Rue Caillaux and Rue Tagore, along Avenue d'Italie, east of the current metro station of Line 7. Access to the Line 14 and Line 7 platforms will be from the centre of a large forecourt where the entrance to the metro is located. Travelers can use escalators or elevators to access the platforms. From the platforms, located about 21 metres (69 feet) deep, the connection to the Line 7 metro will be via the mezzanine. The surface forecourt will provide access to the T3a tram line or the Porte d'Italie bus hub.

The design of the station is entrusted to the consortium led by the engineers SETEC TPI and SYSTRA as well as to Mark Wilson of the Groupe-6 architecture firm.

Californian artist and environmentalist sculptor Ned Kahn will create an art installation overlooking the station in coordination with Mark Wilson. The work called River of Air is made of stainless steel and flexible sheets of ETFE (ethylene tetrafluoroethylene) which will wave and reflect the sunlight above the two of the station emergences.

The preparatory work took place from November 2016 until the end of 2017. The construction of the station began in 2018 for commissioning in 2024. It was awarded in March 2018 to Léon Grosse in a consortium with Soletanche Bachy France.

Culture
The station serves as the backdrop for an important scene from Günter Grass's novel The Tin Drum (1960), in which the hero, Oscar Matzerath, sees the inspectors coming to arrest him as he walks towards the exit using the escalator.

Nearby
 Asian Quarter
 Quartier de la Maison-Blanche

References

Paris Métro stations in the 13th arrondissement of Paris
Railway stations in France opened in 1930